Edward Lewis Paraire (1826–1882) was a British theatre and music hall architect of the Victorian era.

Career

Partnership with Finch Hill

Between 1856–70, Paraire worked with his partner Finch Hill. Together they worked on many music halls and theatres, including Weston's Music Hall (1857), the Islington Philharmonic (1860), the Oxford Music Hall (1861), the Royal Cambridge (1856, in Shoreditch), and the Britannia Theatre (1841, Hoxton) – the last of whose designs was exhibited by Paraire in 1859.

Solo work
The partnership was based in separate houses in the same street, and on its dissolution Paraire returned to designing banks, churches and public houses.

The Museum Tavern, a public house, is a Grade II listed buildings.

Death
Paraire died on 1 August 1882 at 36 Mornington Crescent, Regents Park, London, aged 56 years.

References

External links

1826 births
1882 deaths
English theatre architects
19th-century English architects